Sally and Freedom is a 1981 Swedish drama film directed by Gunnel Lindblom. Gunn Wållgren won the award for Best Actress at the 17th Guldbagge Awards.

Cast
 Ewa Fröling as Sally
 Hans Wigren as Simon
 Leif Ahrle as Jonas
 Gunn Wållgren as Sally's Mother
 Oscar Ljung as Sally's Father
 Svea Holst as Sally's Grandma
 Gunnel Lindblom as Nora
 Kim Anderzon as Inger

References

External links
 
 

1981 films
1981 drama films
Swedish drama films
1980s Swedish-language films
1980s Swedish films